The Bugler of Algiers is a lost 1916 silent film drama directed by Rupert Julian. It was produced by Universal's Bluebird Photoplays division and distributed by Universal Film Manufacturing Company.

Cast
Ella Hall - Gabrielle
Kingsley Benedict - Anatole Picard
Rupert Julian - Pierre

unbilled
Harry Carter - Unknown role
Charles K. French - Unknown role
Florence Noar - Unknown role
Zoe Rae - unknown role

References

External links

The Bugler of Algiers at IMDb.com

1916 films
1916 drama films
American black-and-white films
American silent feature films
Films directed by Rupert Julian
Lost American films
1910s American films